Lorenzo Javier Jorge (born 2 July 1984), also known as Jorge Loren, is a retired Spanish professional kickboxer and K-1 veteran. Loren was the Super Cruiserweight Champion of the Superkombat Fighting Championship. He is also the 2014 Superkombat World Grand Prix tournament champion and fought for the It's Showtime 95MAX world title, losing to Danyo Ilunga by decision after 5 rounds. He has also fought in Enfusion.

As of 1 August 2020, he was ranked the #4 middleweight in the world by Combat Press.

Career
He had his first contact with martial arts as a child. His father was black belt and karate teacher and taught him first steps, also his brother followed him into martial arts.

After injuring his left arm in a fight against Mirko Cro Cop, Loren tried to return to winning ways against Ondřej Hutník for the WKA European title. The fight was scheduled for five three minutes rounds in Prague. Loren lost the fight after five rounds by unanimous decision.

He was scheduled to fight Luis Morais on 13 April 2013 in the K-1 World Qualification - K-1 World MAX Elimination super fight but was pulled out because of K-1 financial problems.

On 3 August 2013 he fought Rustam Guseinov for Katana Fighting World Cruiserweight Title. After three rounds, of Loren's dominance in the ring, judges declared that Guseinov is winner by split decision witch resulted in public outcry. The fight was then declared as no contest, but later an independent review committee was set up to re-judge the decision. The committee, composed of Ernesto Hoost, Andre Mannaart and other high level of the sport, declared Loren as fight winner and he became Katana Fighting world cruiserweight champion.

He lost to Igor Bugaenko by unanimous decision the SuperKombat World Grand Prix 2013 Final Elimination in Ploiesti, Romania on 9 November 2013 in a SuperKombat Cruiserweight title eliminator.

Jorge fought Damian Garcia at Enfusion Live 20 on 12 July 2014.

Titles
2015 World Kickboxing Network Diamond Super Cruiserweight Title 
2015 Superkombat Cruiserweight Championship -95 kg/209 lb 
2015 WFL -95 kg Tournament Championship Runner Up
2015 K-1 Event Grand Prix 2015 Tournament Champion -96 kg
2014 Superkombat Special Prize 
2014 Superkombat Fighter of the Year nomination 
2014 Superkombat World Grand Prix 2014 Tournament Champion
 2013 Katana Fighting World Cruiserweight Title
 2013 WCSF European K1 Champion -95 kg 
 2013 Troyes Trophy Heavyweight - 8 Men Tournament champion
 2010 W.A.K.O Pro World Champion in Low Kick 94.1 kg
 2010 W.P.M.F European Heavyweight Champion 
 2008 W.A.K.O Pro World Champion
 I.S.K.A. European Champion -82 kg
 3 times Spanish Professional Champion
 Spanish Semi-Professional Champion
 Spanish Amateur Champion

Kickboxing record

See also
List of K-1 events
List of It's Showtime events
List of male kickboxers

References

External links
Official Superkombat Profile
Profile at muaythaitv.com

1984 births
Living people
People from Tenerife
Spanish male kickboxers
Spanish Muay Thai practitioners
Sportspeople from the Province of Santa Cruz de Tenerife
Heavyweight kickboxers
Spanish expatriate sportspeople in the Netherlands
SUPERKOMBAT kickboxers